Betty Gray (1920–2018) was a female Welsh international table tennis player.

Table tennis career
She started playing at the age of 19 in 1939 at the Young Conservatives' Club, Swansea.

She won a bronze medal in the 1951 World Table Tennis Championships in the Corbillon Cup (women's team event) with Audrey Bates and Audrey Coombs for Wales.

She played more than 250 times for Wales and for 25 consecutive years she won the Swansea and District Championship Cup.

Awards
She received an MBE and in 2012 was chosen to be a torch bearer when the 2012 Olympic Torch toured Swansea.

Later life
Betty was the President of the Welsh Table Tennis Association. She died in 2018.

See also
 List of table tennis players
 List of World Table Tennis Championships medalists

References

1920 births
2018 deaths
Welsh female table tennis players
Sportspeople from Neath Port Talbot
World Table Tennis Championships medalists